Rhapsody in Blue is a studio album by American pianist Uri Caine. The album was released as a CD on  via Winter & Winter label. A special vinyl LP edition of the album was also released, strictly limited to 500 numbered copies. This release does not have track 9.

Background
Uri Caine Ensemble plays nine famous songs written by George Gershwin and Ira Gershwin. Caine names the album after Gershwin’s masterpiece "Rhapsody in Blue"—as the centerpiece of his new Gershwin interpretations. Caine and Gershwin are connected not only though Jewish East European origin of their families but also through New York City.

Track listing

Personnel
Uri Caine Ensemble
Uri Caine – adaptation, arranger, piano
Ralph Alessi – trumpet
Jim Black – drums
Theo Bleckmann – vocals
Joyce Hammann – violin
Mark Helias – bass
Chris Speed – clarinet, tenor sax
Barbara Walker – vocals

Production
Sinje Dillenkofer – photography
Stefan Winter – producer
Takahashi Winter – executive producer
Adrian von Ripka – editing, mastering

References

2013 albums
Uri Caine albums
Winter & Winter Records albums